This article contains lists of medalists for the United States men's national water polo team at the Summer Olympics, and is part of the United States men's Olympic water polo team statistics series. The lists are updated as of October 5, 2019.

Abbreviations

Water polo Olympic medalists

Players
The following table is pre-sorted by number of Olympic medals (in descending order), type of the Olympic medal (in descending order), date of receiving an Olympic medal (in ascending order), name of the person (in ascending order), respectively.

Eighty-seven athletes have won Olympic medals in water polo. Six of them have each won two Olympic medals. Aside from Wally O'Connor, who won medals before World War II, all were members of the men's national team that won consecutive silver medals in 1984 and 1988.

Head coaches
The following tables are pre-sorted by number of Olympic medals (in descending order), type of the Olympic medal (in descending order), date of receiving an Olympic medal (in ascending order), name of the person (in ascending order), respectively.

Monte Nitzkowski is the first and only man to have won two Olympic medals as the head coach of the United States men's national team.

Terry Schroeder is the first and only American (man or woman) to have won medals in the Olympic water polo tournaments both as a player and as a head coach.

Age records

Top 20 oldest Olympic medalists
The following table is pre-sorted by age of receiving an Olympic medal (in descending order), date of receiving an Olympic medal (in ascending order), Cap number or name of the player (in ascending order), respectively.

Top 20 youngest Olympic medalists
The following table is pre-sorted by age of receiving an Olympic medal (in ascending order), date of receiving an Olympic medal (in ascending order), Cap number or name of the player (in ascending order), respectively.

Multiple Olympic medalists in water polo, diving and swimming
Budd Goodwin is the only American to have won Olympic medals in water polo, diving and swimming.

Multiple Olympic medalists in water polo and diving
Aside from Budd Goodwin, Frank Kehoe is the other American to have won Olympic medals in water polo and diving.

Multiple Olympic medalists in water polo and swimming
The following table is pre-sorted by number of Olympic medals (in descending order), type of the Olympic medal (in descending order), date of the Olympic water polo tournament (in ascending order), name of the player (in ascending order), respectively.

Twelve American athletes aside from Budd Goodwin have won Olympic medals in water polo and swimming.

As a member of the 1924 and 1928 U.S. Olympic water polo team, Johnny Weissmuller won five Olympic gold medals in swimming and one bronze medal in water polo.

Tim Shaw is the only American athlete to have won Olympic medals in water polo and swimming after World War II.

Swimming Olympic medalists without an Olympic medal in water polo
The following table is pre-sorted by number of Olympic medals (in descending order), type of the Olympic medal (in descending order), date of the Olympic water polo tournament (in ascending order), name of the player (in ascending order), respectively.

Aside from thirteen athletes above, another five American water polo players have won Olympic medals in swimming.

Among the eighteen athletes, Brad Schumacher is the only American player to have competed in an Olympic water polo tournament since 2000.

See also
 United States men's Olympic water polo team statistics
 United States men's Olympic water polo team statistics (appearances)
 United States men's Olympic water polo team statistics (matches played)
 United States men's Olympic water polo team statistics (scorers)
 United States men's Olympic water polo team statistics (goalkeepers)
 List of United States men's Olympic water polo team rosters
 United States men's Olympic water polo team results
 United States men's national water polo team

References

External links
 Official website

Men's Olympic statistics 5
Olympic men's statistics 5
United States Olympic men's statistics 5